Jiuduansha is a collection of four intertidal wetland shoals at the mouth of China's Yangtze River. They are administered as an island region of the municipality of Shanghai's Pudong New Area.

These shoals and the submerged land surrounding them to a depth of  form the Jiuduansha Wetland Nature Reserve. The area is considered one of the national urban wetland parks of China and forms part of the China Biosphere Reserve Network. A 1996 field study found that, for seven bird species investigated, the number present at Jiuduansha exceeded 1% of the world's total for the species, establishing it as a Wetland of International Importance.

Name
Although Jiuduansha literally translates as "Nine-Part Sands", the number nine is here being used in a colloquial way similar to English several. In fact, the group consists of four main shoals. South Jiuduansha is known as Jiangya Nansha in Chinese after the pinyin romanization of the SS Kiangya, the passenger steamer which exploded nearby (probably owing to a mine from the Second World War or the Chinese Civil War) in 1948.

History
Jiuduansha originally formed part of the Waitongsha shoal, but frequent floods of the Yangtze in 1949 and 1954 connected a series of troughs and separated Jiuduansha from the Tongsha shoal. Shanghai's universities have studied Jiuduansha since the 1990s and, in 1995, introduced cordgrass in order to speed the shoal's stabilization, particularly in light of roughly 70% reduction in sedimentation caused by the many dams erected along the course of the Yangtze during the 20th century. In March 2000 or 2003, the Shanghai municipal government established the nature reserve. The cordgrass and environmental protection were intended to accommodate birds then living at the site being developed as Pudong International Airport. From October 2002 to January 2003, Fudan University and the reserve's administration conducted four joint surveys and, in 2005, the wetland was upgraded to a national nature reserve. In the time since its introduction, the cordgrass has been found to have become invasive, aggressively crowding out the native reeds and bulrushes and degrading parts of the wetlands.

Ecology
Jiuduansha is the spawning ground for the hairy crab, one of the most important products of the Chinese fishing industry and a delicacy of the cuisine of Shanghai and eastern China. The shoals also host large communities of Cipango and Siberian prawn and swimming crabs. They are known to host 5 protected species of fish and 14 protected species of birds, including the black-faced spoonbill. All 14 observed species of aquatic mammals are protected and Jiuduansha is thought to be the most important habitat in China for the finless porpoise, the bottlenose dolphin, and the spotted seal.

References

External links
The Shanghai Jiuduansha Wetland Nature Reserve

Islands of Shanghai
Pudong